William Paul Daniel (November 10, 1937 – June 29, 2015) was an American football defensive back who played nine seasons in the NFL.

Career
Daniel was born in New Albany, Mississippi. He played high school football at Macon High School and in college at Mississippi State. He went undrafted in the 1961 NFL draft but was signed by the Pittsburgh Steelers, where he played for six seasons and made 11 interceptions and one touchdown. In 1967, he was signed to the Los Angeles Rams, playing for three seasons and making three interceptions. In 1969, a knee injury forced him to retire from football.

Post-football career
Following retirement, Daniel returned to Starkville and began an insurance company. In 1970, he opened an athletic club, which led to the formation of the Mississippi Racquetball Association in 1975. He also coached junior football and baseball teams. In 1986, he was elected into the Mississippi State Sports Hall of Fame.

Personal life and health
In 1959, Daniel married Ruth Nash. They had three children. Within the last decade of his life, Daniel suffered from dementia attributed to the numerous concussions he received during his football career. He became a part of a Boston University research project for football head injuries.  He donated a portion of his brain and spinal cord for the project in hopes of developing procedures and equipment to make the sport safer for athletes. Daniel died on June 29, 2015, aged 77. He was diagnosed after death with stage 4 CTE.

References

1937 births
2015 deaths
People from New Albany, Mississippi
American football cornerbacks
Pittsburgh Steelers players
Los Angeles Rams players
Mississippi State Bulldogs football players
Neurological disease deaths in Mississippi
Deaths from motor neuron disease